The ATP Saint-Vincent, also known as the Campionati Internazionali della Valle D'Aosta, was a men's tennis tournament played in Saint-Vincent, Italy. It was played from 1986 until 1989 on outdoor clay courts and was part of the Grand Prix tennis circuit. In 1990 the tournament was succeeded by the Sanremo Open.

Finals

Singles

Doubles

See also
 Valle d'Aosta Open – challenger tournament

References

External links
 ATP World Tour archive

ATP Tour
Defunct tennis tournaments in Italy
Clay court tennis tournaments